Lácar is a department located in the south of Neuquén Province, Argentina.

Geography 

Departments of Neuquén Province